Caliga v. Inter Ocean Newspaper Co., 215 U.S. 182 (1909), was a United States Supreme Court case in which the Court held a person cannot file a second copyright claim to amend the first, even if the first was determined to be invalid.

References

External links
 

1909 in United States case law
United States copyright case law
United States Supreme Court cases
United States Supreme Court cases of the Fuller Court